The Oionus I was a tetrahedral triplane built  for  Alexander Graham Bell It was the culmination of Bell's experiments with kites built at Baddeck, Nova Scotia. The aircraft's design combined those of the Aerial Experiment Association (AEA)'s AEA Silver Dart biplane and his AEA Cygnet kite. It was Bell's final aviation pursuit and Canada's first and only triplane design. The aircraft attempted a test flight in March 1910, but failed to achieve flight.

Design and development
The Oionus I had its origins in March 1909 with the dissolution of the AEA, when Alexander Graham Bell hired both Frederick W. "Casey" Baldwin as an engineer and J.A.D. McCurdy as assistant engineer to build the last of Bell's designs. Incorporating tetrahedral sections in the structure of the triplane design continued the concept of the tetrahedral kites that had originally been tested in Bell's AEA Cygnet series that had achieved a short hop in the Cygnet III but were abandoned as a concept by Bell.

The triplane design that was chosen employed a longer central plane with wingtip ailerons, with flying controls based on a fixed biplane tail and rudder at the rear and a canard biplane elevator section at the front. The internal structure was based on tubular-steel with linen-covered wings and interior sections; a four-wheel chassis or running gear formed the undercarriage. A Curtiss pusher engine drove a propeller through a chain and sprocket arrangement; later a Kirkham engine from the Baddeck No. 2 was substituted.

Operational history
After construction was complete in February 1910, and a new engine was installed, McCurdy readied the aircraft for flight, taking it out on some ground runs. Ballast was added to the tail and on 25 March 1910, a test flight off the ice at Baddeck Bay succeeded in three of the four wheels coming off the ground. McCurdy ended the flight in order for modification to be made for future testing, including adding more incidence to the wings. Shortly after, the ice melted and no further attempts were made to fly the Oionus I.

Specifications (Oionos I)

References
Notes

Bibliography

 Green, H. Gordon. The Silver Dart: The Authentic Story of the Hon. J.A.D. McCurdy, Canada's First Pilot. Fredericton, New Brunswick: Atlantic Advocate Book, 1959.
 Harding, Les. McCurdy and the Silver Dart. Sydney, Nova Scotia: University College of Cape Breton, 1998. .
 Milberry, Larry. Aviation in Canada: The Pioneer Decades, Vol. 1. Toronto: CANAV Books, 2008. .
 Molson, Ken M. and Harold A. Taylor. Canadian Aircraft Since 1909. Stittsville, Ontario: Canada's Wings, Inc., 1982. .
 Payne, Stephen, ed. Canadian Wings: A Remarkable Century of Flight. Vancouver: Douglas & McIntyre, 2006. .
 Petrie, A. Roy. Alexander Graham Bell. Richmond Hill, Ontario, Canada: Fitzhenry & Whiteside, 1992. .

External links

 Baddeck no. 2 in Flight, 9 April 1910
 Their Flying Machines: Baddeck No. 1 and No. 2
 Baddeck no. 1
 Canadian Aerodrome Company
 Canadian Aerodrome Company

1900s Canadian experimental aircraft
Victoria County, Nova Scotia
Alexander Graham Bell
Single-engined tractor aircraft
Aircraft first flown in 1910